1515 Poydras (formerly the Gulf Building), located at 1515 Poydras Street in the Central Business District of New Orleans, Louisiana, is a 29-story, -tall skyscraper.

See also
 List of tallest buildings in New Orleans

External links

  1515 Poydras, Official Website

Skyscraper office buildings in New Orleans
Office buildings completed in 1984
Skidmore, Owings & Merrill buildings